AS Aigle Rouge is a football club in Isiro, Democratic Republic of Congo.  They play in the Linafoot, the top level of professional football in DR Congo. 

Football clubs in the Democratic Republic of the Congo
Isiro